Pugilina morio, common name : the Giant Hairy Melongena, is a species of sea snail, a marine gastropod mollusk in the family Melongenidae, the crown conches and their allies.

Distribution
This species is found in the Atlantic Ocean along Angola, the Canary Islands, Cape Verde, Gabon, Mauritania; in the Caribbean Sea and the Lesser Antilles and along Brazil.

Description
The adult shell size varies between 75 mm and 270 mm.

References

 Bernard, P.A. (Ed.) (1984). Coquillages du Gabon [Shells of Gabon]. Pierre A. Bernard: Libreville, Gabon. 140, 75 plates
 Rolán E., 2005. Malacological Fauna From The Cape Verde Archipelago. Part 1, Polyplacophora and Gastropoda
 Gofas, S.; Afonso, J.P.; Brandào, M. (Ed.). (S.a.). Conchas e Moluscos de Angola = Coquillages et Mollusques d'Angola. [Shells and molluscs of Angola]. Universidade Agostinho / Elf Aquitaine Angola: Angola. 140 pp

Melongenidae
Gastropods described in 1758
Taxa named by Carl Linnaeus
Molluscs of the Atlantic Ocean
Molluscs of Brazil
Molluscs of the Canary Islands
Molluscs of Angola
Gastropods of Cape Verde
Invertebrates of Gabon